CICM most commonly refers to:
 CICM Missionaries, a Roman Catholic missionary religious congregation of men established in 1862 

CICM may also refer to:
 Chartered Institute of Credit Management, a United Kingdom-based professional body representing credit professionals
 Central India Christian Mission, a Christian missionary organization in India
 Chulabhorn International College of Medicine, a medical school located in Thailand
 College of Intensive Care Medicine, also known as College of Intensive Care Medicine of Australia and New Zealand